Pensacola is the westernmost city in the Florida Panhandle, and the county seat and only incorporated city of Escambia County, Florida, United States. At the 2020 United States census, the population was 54,312. Pensacola is the principal city of the Pensacola Metropolitan Area, which had an estimated 502,629 residents in 2019.

Pensacola is the site of the first Spanish settlement within the borders of the continental United States in 1559, predating the establishment of St. Augustine by 6 years, although the settlement was abandoned due to a hurricane and not re-established until 1698. Pensacola is a seaport on Pensacola Bay, which is protected by the barrier island of Santa Rosa and connects to the Gulf of Mexico. A large United States Naval Air Station, the first in the United States, is located southwest of Pensacola near Warrington; it is the base of the Blue Angels flight demonstration team and the National Naval Aviation Museum. The main campus of the University of West Florida is situated north of the city center.

The area was originally inhabited by Muskogean-speaking peoples. The Pensacola people lived there at the time of European contact, and Creek people frequently visited and traded from present-day southern Alabama and Mississippi and southeast of Louisiana. Spanish explorer Tristán de Luna founded a short-lived settlement in 1559. In 1698 the Spanish established a presidio in the area, from which the modern city gradually developed. The area changed hands several times as European powers competed in North America. During Florida's British rule (1763–1781), fortifications were strengthened.

It is nicknamed "The City of Five Flags", due to the five governments that have ruled it during its history: the flags of Spain (Castile), France, Great Britain, the United States of America, and the Confederate States of America. Other nicknames include "World's Whitest Beaches" (due to the white sand of Florida panhandle beaches), "Cradle of Naval Aviation", "Western Gate to the Sunshine State", "America's First Settlement", "Emerald Coast", and "P-Cola".

History

Pre-European

The original inhabitants of the Pensacola Bay area were Native American peoples. At the time of European contact, a Muskogean-speaking tribe known to the Spanish as the Pensacola lived in the region. This name was not recorded until 1677, but the tribe appears to be the source of the name "Pensacola" for the bay and thence the city. Creek people, also Muskogean-speaking, came regularly from present-day southern Alabama to trade, so the peoples were part of a broader regional and even continental network of relations.

This site has at least 18 large earthwork mounds, five of which are arranged around a central plaza. Its main occupation was from 1250 CE to 1550. It was a ceremonial center for the Pensacola people and a gateway to their society. This site would have had easy access by a dugout canoe, the main mode of transportation used by the Pensacola.

Spanish

The area's written recorded history begins in the 16th century, with documentation by Spanish explorers who were the first Europeans to reach the area. The expeditions of Pánfilo de Narváez in 1528 and Hernando de Soto in 1539 both visited Pensacola Bay, the latter of which documented the name "Bay of Ochuse".

In the age of sailing ships Pensacola was the busiest port on the Gulf of Mexico, having the deepest harbor on the Gulf.

In 1559, Tristán de Luna y Arellano landed with some 1,500 people on 11 ships from Veracruz, Mexico. The expedition was to establish an outpost, ultimately called Santa María de Ochuse by Luna, as a base for Spanish efforts to colonize Santa Elena (present-day Parris Island, South Carolina.) But the colony was decimated by a hurricane on September 19, 1559, which killed an unknown number of sailors and colonists, sank six ships, grounded a seventh, and ruined supplies.

The survivors struggled to survive, most moving inland to what is now central Alabama for several months in 1560 before returning to the coast; but in 1561, the effort was abandoned. Some of the survivors eventually sailed to Santa Elena, but another storm struck there. Survivors made their way to Cuba and finally returned to Pensacola, where the remaining fifty at Pensacola were taken back to Veracruz. The Viceroy's advisers later concluded that northwest Florida was too dangerous to settle. They ignored it for 137 years.

In the late 17th century, the French began exploring the lower Mississippi River with the intention of colonizing the region as part of La Louisiane or New France in North America. Fearful that Spanish territory would be threatened, the Spanish founded a new settlement in western Florida. In 1698 they established a fortified town near what is now Fort Barrancas, laying the foundation for permanent European-dominated settlement of the modern city of Pensacola. The Spanish built three presidios in Pensacola:
 Presidio Santa Maria de Galve (1698–1719): the presidio included fort San Carlos de Austria (east of present Fort Barrancas) and a village with church;
 Presidio Isla de Santa Rosa (1722–1752): this next presidio was on western Santa Rosa Island near the site of present Fort Pickens, but hurricanes battered the island in 1741 and 1752. The garrison was moved to the mainland;

During the early years of settlement, a tri-racial creole society developed. As a fortified trading post, the Spanish had mostly men stationed here. Some married or had unions with Pensacola, Creek or African women, both slave and free, and their descendants created a mixed-race population of mestizos and mulattos. The Spanish encouraged fugitive slaves from the Southern colonies to come to Florida as a refuge, promising freedom in exchange for conversion to Catholicism. King Charles II of Spain issued a royal proclamation freeing all slaves who fled to Spanish Florida and accepted conversion and baptism. Most went to the area around St. Augustine, but escaped slaves also reached Pensacola. St. Augustine had mustered an all-black militia unit defending Spain as early as 1683.

British

After years of settlement, the Spanish ceded Florida to the British in 1763 as a result of an exchange following British victory over both France and Spain in the French and Indian War (the North American theater of the Seven Years' War), and French cession of its territories in North America. The British designated Pensacola as the capital of their new colony of West Florida. From 1763, the British strengthened defenses around the mainland area of fort San Carlos de Barrancas, building the Royal Navy Redoubt. George Johnstone was appointed as the first British Governor, and in 1764 a colonial assembly was established. The structure of the colony was modeled after the existing British colonies in America, as opposed to French Canada, which was based on a different structure.  West Florida was invited to send delegates to the First Continental Congress which was convened to present colonial grievances against the British Parliament to George III, but along with several other colonies, including East Florida, they declined the invitation. Once the American War of Independence had broken out, the colonists remained overwhelmingly loyal to the Crown. In 1778 the Willing Expedition proceeded with a small force down the Mississippi, ransacking estates and plantations, until they were eventually defeated by a local militia. In the wake of this, the area received a small number of British reinforcements.

British military resources were limited and Pensacola ranked fairly low on their list of priorities.  For this reason only small token amounts of British military forces were ever sent to defend Pensacola.  This was in contrast to colonies such as South Carolina, where large numbers of British soldiers were sent.  After Spain joined the American Revolution in 1779 on the side of the rebels, Spanish forces captured the city in the 1781 Siege of Pensacola, gaining control of West Florida. After the war, the British officially ceded both West Florida and East Florida to Spain as part of the post-war peace settlement.

In 1785 many Creek from southern Alabama and Georgia came to trade and Pensacola developed as a major trade center. It was a garrison town, predominantly males in the military or trade. Americans made raids into the area, and settlers pressured the federal government to gain control of this territory.

United States

In the final stages of the War of 1812, American troops launched an offensive on Pensacola against the Spanish and British garrisons protecting the city, which surrendered after two days of fighting. Pensacola was conquered again by the USA in 1818. In 1819, Spain and the United States negotiated the Adams–Onís Treaty, by which Spain recognised the American control over Florida in exchange of the American recognition of Spanish control over Texas. A Spanish census of 1820 indicated 181 households in the town, with a third of mixed-blood. The people were predominantly French and Spanish Creole. Indians in the area were noted through records, travelers' accounts, and paintings of the era, including some by George Washington Sully and George Catlin. Creek women were also recorded in marriages to Spanish men, in court records or deeds.

In 1821, with Andrew Jackson as provisional governor, Pensacola became part of the United States. The Creek continued to interact with European Americans and African Americans, but the dominant whites increasingly imposed their binary racial classifications: white and black ("colored", within which were included free people of color, including Indians). However, American Indians and mestizos were identified separately in court and Catholic church records, and as Indians in censuses up until 1840, attesting to their presence in the society. After that, the Creek were not separately identified as Indian, but the people did not disappear. Even after removal of many Seminole to Indian Territory, Indians, often of mixed-race but culturally identifying as Muskogean, lived throughout Florida.

St. Michael's Cemetery was established in the 18th century at a location in a south central part of the city, which developed as the Downtown area. Initially owned by the Church of St. Michael, it is now owned and managed by St. Michael's Cemetery Foundation of Pensacola, Inc. Preliminary studies indicate that there are over 3,200 marked burials as well as a large number unmarked.

Tensions between the white community and Indians tended to increase during the Removal era. In addition, an increasing proportion of Anglo-Americans, who constituted the majority of whites by 1840, led to a hardening of racial discrimination in the area. There was disapproval of white men living with women of color, which had previously been accepted. In 1853 the legislature passed a bill prohibiting Indians from living in the state, and provided for capture and removal to Indian Territory.

While the bill excluded mixed-Indians and those already living in white communities, they went "underground" to escape persecution. No Indians were listed in late 19th and early 20th century censuses for Escambia County. People of Indian descent were forced into the white or black communities by appearance, and officially, in terms of records, "disappeared". It was a pattern repeated in many Southern settlements. Children of white fathers and Indian mothers were not designated as Indian in the late 19th century, whereas children of blacks or mulattos were classified within the black community, related to laws during the slavery years.

In 1907–1908 there were 116 Creek in Pensacola who applied for the Eastern Cherokee enrollment, thinking that all Indians were eligible to enroll. Based on Alabama census records, most of these individuals have been found to be descendants of Creek who had migrated to the Pensacola area from southern Alabama after Indian removal of the 1830s.

Prior to this period Pensacola experienced the Civil War when in 1861 Confederate forces lost the nearby Battle of Santa Rosa Island and federal forces of the United States subsequently failed to win the Battle of Pensacola.  After the fall of New Orleans in 1862 the Confederacy abandoned the city and it was occupied by the North. In June, 1861, the Pensacola Guards were mustered in as a company in the 1st Florida Infantry Regiment.

Geography

Topography
Pensacola is located on the north side of Pensacola Bay.

The land is sloped up northward from Pensacola Bay, with most of the city at an elevation above that which a potential hurricane storm surge could affect.

Climate
Weather statistics since the late 20th century have been recorded at the airport. According to the Köppen Climate Classification system, Pensacola has a humid subtropical climate, (Köppen Cfa), with short, mild winters and hot, humid summers. Typical summer conditions have highs in the lower 90s °F (32–34 °C) and lows in the mid 70s °F (23–24 °C). Afternoon or evening thunderstorms are common during the summer months. Due partly to the coastal location, temperatures above  are relatively rare, and last occurred in June 2011, when two of the first four days of the month recorded highs reaching the century mark. 

Freezing temperatures occur an average of 11 days per winter, with the average first and last dates for a freeze being December 12 and February 14, giving Pensacola an average growing season of 301 days. However, the relatively recent winter season of 2018-19 did not record a freeze, the median first and last freeze dates are earlier and later than the averages of December 12 and February 14, and the median number of freezes per season is 11 or fewer. 

Snow is rare in Pensacola, but does occasionally fall. The most recent snowfall event occurred December 9, 2017, and the snow event previous to it occurred on February 12, 2010. The city receives  of precipitation per year, with a slightly more rainy season in the summer. In June 2012 over one foot (300 mm) of rain fell on Pensacola and adjacent areas, leading to widespread flooding. On April 29, 2014, Pensacola was drenched by at least 20 inches of rain within a 24-hour period, causing the worst flooding in 30 years

The city suffered a major blow on February 23, 2016, when a large EF3 wedge tornado hit the northwest part of Pensacola, causing major damage and several injuries.

Hurricanes

Pensacola's location on the Florida Panhandle makes it vulnerable to hurricanes. Hurricanes which have made landfall at or near Pensacola since the late 20th century include Eloise (1975), Frederic (1979), Juan (1985), Erin (1995), Opal (1995), Georges (1998), Ivan (2004), Dennis (2005), and Sally (2020). In July 2005, Hurricane Dennis made landfall just east of the city, sparing it the damage received from Ivan the year before. However, hurricane and near-hurricane-force winds were recorded in downtown, causing moderate damage.

Pensacola received only a glancing blow from Hurricane Katrina in 2005, resulting in light to moderate damage reported in the area. The aftermath of the extensive damage from Katrina was a dramatic reduction in tourism coming from Louisiana, Mississippi and Alabama.

Hurricane Ivan

On September 16, 2004, Pensacola and several surrounding areas were devastated by Hurricane Ivan. Pensacola was on the eastern side of the eyewall, which sent a large storm surge into Escambia Bay; this destroyed most of the I-10 Escambia Bay Bridge. The storm knocked 58 spans off the eastbound and westbound bridges and misaligned another 66 spans, forcing the bridge to close to traffic in both directions. The surge also destroyed the fishing bridge that spanned Pensacola Bay alongside the Phillip Beale Memorial Bridge, locally known as the Three Mile Bridge.

Over $6 billion in damage occurred in the metro area and more than 10,000 homes were destroyed, with another 27,000 heavily damaged. 105,000 households in Northwest Florida were impacted in some way by the storm, and 4,300 businesses in the area permanently closed as a result of Hurricane Ivan. NASA created a comparison image to illustrate the massive damage. This widespread destruction of property caused a temporary lack of affordable housing in the Pensacola real estate market, and Hurricane Dennis and Hurricane Katrina contributed to a general scarcity of construction labor and resources along the Gulf Coast.

Hurricane Sally

In September 2020, Pensacola suffered heavy damage by Hurricane Sally. Damages in Escambia County were estimated by local officials at $29 million. Downtown Pensacola was flooded.

Demographics 

Pensacola's first appearance in the U.S. Census dataset was in 1850, with a total recorded population of 2,164. Pensacola was Florida's largest city in 1860 with the population of 2,876.

2020 census

Note: the US Census treats Hispanic/Latino as an ethnic category. This table excludes Latinos from the racial categories and assigns them to a separate category. Hispanics/Latinos can be of any race.

2010 Census
As of the census of 2010, there were 51,923 people, 23,600 households, and 14,665 families residing in the city, and 402,000 people in the Pensacola MSA. The racial makeup of the city was 66.3% White, 28.0% African American, 2.0% Asian, 0.6% Native American, 0.1% Pacific Islander, 2.3% from two or more races. 3.3% were Hispanic or Latino of any race.

There were 24,524 households, out of which 24.6% had children living with them, 39.7% were married couples living together, 16.7% had a female householder with no husband present, and 40.2% were non-families. 32.9% of all households were made up of individuals, and 11.7% had someone living alone who was 65 years of age or older. The average household size was 2.27 and the average family size was 2.92.

Out of the total population in Pensacola, 45.9% identified with a religion, slightly lower than the national average of 48.3%. Over 48% of Pensacolians who practice a religion identify as Baptists (22.1% of all city residents). Other Christian denominations include Roman Catholics (9.2% of city residents), Pentecostal (3.8%), Methodist (3.8%), Episcopal (1.1%), Presbyterian (1.1%), and Orthodox (0.3%).

Pensacola is home to a small (0.2% of city residents) but significant Jewish community, whose roots date mostly to German Jewish immigrants of the mid-to-late 19th century. There were also Sephardic Jewish migrants from other areas of the South, and immigrants from other areas of Europe. The first Florida chapter of B'nai Brith was founded downtown in 1874, as well as the first temple, Beth-El, in 1876. Apart from the Reform Beth-El, Pensacola is also served by the Conservative B'nai Israel Synagogue. Paula Ackerman, the first woman who performed rabbinical functions in the United States, was a Pensacola native and led services at Beth-El.

The median income for a household in the city was $34,779, and the median income for a family was $42,868. Males had a median income of $32,258 versus $23,582 for females. The per capita income for the city was $30,556 in 2011. About 12.7% of families and 16.3% of the population were below the poverty line, including 26.2% of those under age 18 and 9.2% of those age 65 or over.

Economy

Military
The city has been referred to as "The Cradle of Naval Aviation". Naval Air Station Pensacola (NASP) was the first Naval Air Station commissioned by the U.S. Navy in 1914. Tens of thousands naval aviators have received their training there, including John H. Glenn, USMC, who became the first American to orbit the earth in 1962, and Neil Armstrong, who became the first man to set foot on the moon in 1969. The Navy's Flight Demonstration Squadron, the Blue Angels, is stationed there.

The National Museum of Naval Aviation is located on the Naval Air Station and is free to the public. The museum cares for and exhibits hundreds of vintage Naval Aviation aircraft and preserves the history of Naval Aviation through displays, symposiums, IMAX movies and tours.

Corry Station Naval Technical Training Center serves as an annex for the main base and the center for Information Dominance.  CWO3 Gary R. Schuetz Memorial Health Clinic is at Corry Station, Naval Hospital Pensacola, as is the main Navy Exchange and Defense Commissary Agency commissary complex for both Corry Station and NAS Pensacola. The Army National Guard B Troop 1-153 Cavalry, Bravo Company 146th Expeditionary Signal Battalion is stationed in Pensacola.

Tourism
Pensacola is home to a number of annual festivals, events, historic tours, and landmarks. The Pensacola Seafood Festival and the Pensacola Crawfish Festival have been held for nearly 30 years in the city's historic downtown. The Great Gulfcoast Arts Festival is held annually in November in Seville Square, and often draws more than 200 regional and international artists. The Children's Art Festival, also held in Seville Square, displays art by local schoolchildren. Pensacon is a comic convention held each February, with nearly 25,000 attendees from around the world. The Pensacola Interstate Fair is held each fall.

Scuba diving and deep sea fishing are a large part of Pensacola's tourism industry. The USS Oriskany was purposefully sunk in 2004 to create an artificial reef off the shores of Pensacola.

There are several walking tours of restored 18th-century-era neighborhoods in Pensacola.

Pensacola is the site of the Vietnam Veterans' Wall South. There are a number of historical military installations from the Civil War, including Fort Barrancas. Fort Pickens served as a temporary prison for Geronimo. Other military landmarks include the National Naval Aviation Museum and Pensacola Lighthouse at NAS Pensacola.

The city's convention and visitors' bureau, Visit Pensacola, is overseen by the Greater Pensacola Chamber.

Top employers

Arts and culture

The arts and theatre

There are a number of performance venues in the Pensacola area, including the Pensacola Bay Center (formerly the Pensacola Civic Center), often used for big-ticket events, and the Saenger Theater, used for performances and mid-level events. Other theatres used for live performances, plays, and musicals include the Pensacola Little Theatre, Pensacola State College, University of West Florida, Vinyl Music Hall, and Loblolly Theatre. Pensacola is also home to the Pensacola Opera, Pensacola Children's Chorus, Pensacola Symphony Orchestra, Pensacola Civic Band, Pensacola Bay Concert Band, and the Choral Society of Pensacola, as well as Ballet Pensacola. There is also the Palafox Place entertainment district.

Architecture

Pensacola does not have a prominent skyline, but has several low-rise buildings. Other tall buildings include the Scenic Apartments, SunTrust Tower, Seville Tower, and the AT&T Building.

Historic buildings in Pensacola include the First National Bank Building.

Museums
Historic Pensacola's Museum of Commerce
Museum of Industry
National Naval Aviation Museum
Pensacola MESS Hall
Pensacola Museum of Art

Pelican Drop
The Pelican Drop was a New Year's Eve celebration that took place each year in downtown Pensacola. At the ceremony, a pelican, the city's mascot, was dropped instead of the typical New Year's ball. The event included live music and fireworks.  Since 2008, The Pelican Drop has become a significant attraction in the area, drawing in crowds of up to 50,000 local residents, making it one of the largest events of its kind in the Central Time Zone. In 2014, the event was named as one of the Top 20 Events in the Southeast by the Southeast Tourism Society.

History
The First Pelican Drop New Year's Celebration took place in 2008. The Pensacola News Journal released an article stating that the CRA (or Pensacola Community Redevelopment Agency) was working on making a new kind of New Year's Eve celebration. The paper said that the celebration will be held at the Plaza Ferdinand VII and will also be live on WEAR-TV; beginning with the 2017 celebration, events were carried in simulcast on WEAR's Website.  Almost 45,000 people showed up for the event, including residents of Mobile, Alabama (which hosts its own competing drop, a Moon Pie), Milton, Florida, Navarre, Florida, and Destin, Florida.

In December 2019, organizers announced that the Pelican Drop had been canceled due to financial issues and the burden the event had caused on local police and public services. A smaller fireworks display, which does not require the same amount of traffic disruption, will be held instead.

The pelican was made and designed by Emmett Andrews LLC.

Sports

Notable sports teams in Penascola include:

Previously, the Pensacola Pelicans was an independent league baseball team that played at Jim Spooner Field from 2002 to 2010.

The city hosted professional golf tournaments such as the Pensacola Open (PGA Tour, 1958-1988), the Pensacola Ladies Invitational (LPGA Tour, 1965-1968) and Pensacola Classic (Nike Tour, 1990-1995).

America's Cup team American Magic call Pensecola their home port until the 2024 America's Cup commences.

The Five Flags Speedway is a half-mile paved racetrack that opened in 1953. It hosts the Snowball Derby stock car race every December since 1968. It has also hosted rounds of the NASCAR Grand National (now NASCAR Cup Series), Superstar Racing Experience, NASCAR Southeast Series, ARCA Racing Series, ARCA Menards Series East, ASA National Tour, CARS Pro Cup Series and Southern Super Series.

Parks and recreation
 Gulf Islands National Seashore
 Pensacola Bayfront Stadium - a multi-use park in Pensacola
 Plaza Ferdinand VII
 Bayview Park
 Miraflores Park

Government

The city of Pensacola utilizes a strong mayor-council form of government, which was adopted in 2011 after citizens voted in 2009 to approve a new city charter. An elected mayor serves as the chief executive of the city government, while a seven-member city council serves as the city's governing body. A council president is selected by the council from its members, along with a vice president.

City voters approved a charter amendment on June 11, 2013, which eliminated the then-nine member council's two at-large seats; one seat was phased out in November 2014, and the other expired in November 2016. Two additional charter amendments were approved on November 4, 2014, which made the position of mayor subject to recall and provided the city council with the authority to hire staff. The current city hall was opened in 1986.

Politics
After the Civil War, Pensacola, like the rest of the South, was controlled by Republicans during the Reconstruction era (1865-1877). The Republican government had numerous African American politicians, including several county commissioners, city aldermen, constables, state representatives, and even one African American mayor—Salvador Pons. However, with the 1884 election of native Pensacolian and former Confederate general Edward Perry, a dramatic shift occurred. Perry, a Democrat who actually lost the Escambia County vote during the statewide election, acted to dissolve the Republican city government of Pensacola and in 1885 replaced this government with hand-picked successors, including railroad magnate William D. Chipley. The only African American to remain in city government was George Washington Witherspoon, a pastor with the African Methodist Episcopal Church who was previously a Republican and switched parties to the Democrats. Following Governor Perry's dissolution of the Republican government, the city remained Democratic for more than a century after the Civil War with no African Americans serving in an elected capacity for nearly a century.

This changed in 1994, when Republican attorney Joe Scarborough defeated Vince Whibbs, Jr., the son of popular former Democratic mayor Vince Whibbs, in a landslide to represent , which is based in Pensacola. Republicans also swept all of the area's seats in the state legislature, the majority of which were held by Democrats. Since then, Republicans have dominated every level of government, although municipal elections are officially nonpartisan. In August 2005, registered Republicans outnumbered Democrats for the first time in the area's history. As of August 2005, in Escambia County, 44% of the residents were registered Republicans compared to 39.91% of the population having registered as Democrats, with another 13.21% having no party affiliation.

In the 2004 presidential election, 65% of Escambia County residents voted for George W. Bush over John Kerry. The Pensacola area has not supported a Democrat for president since John F. Kennedy in 1960. In 1968, Pensacola and the rest of North Florida supported American Independent Party candidate George Wallace.

Regional representatives
Pensacola is currently represented in the U.S. House of Representatives by Matt Gaetz (R), in the state senate by Doug Broxson (R), and in the state house by District 2 representative Alex Andrade (R).

Education
The main campus of Pensacola State College is in the City of Pensacola. The University of West Florida (UWF) operates a campus in downtown Pensacola. Its main campus, located north of the city, has the largest library in the region, the John C. Pace Library.  UWF is the largest post-secondary institution in the area.

Public primary and secondary schools in Pensacola are administered by the Escambia County School District. The district operates two high schools (Booker T. Washington and Pensacola) within the City of Pensacola. District-run high schools near the city include Escambia, J. M. Tate, and Pine Forest. Other public schools in the city include A.K. Suter Elementary, Cordova Park Elementary, J.H. Workman Middle, N.B. Cook Elementary, O.J. Semmes Elementary, and Scenic Heights Elementary. The district also operates one magnet high school (West Florida High School of Advanced Technology) near the city.

Several private schools operate within or near the city: East Hill Academy, East Hill Christian School, Episcopal Day School of Christ Church, Pensacola Catholic High School, Pensacola Christian Academy, Sacred Heart Cathedral School, Saint John the Evangelist Catholic School, Saint Paul Catholic School, Little Flower Catholic School, and Seville Bayside Montessori. The campus of Pensacola Christian College is near the city.

Media

The largest daily newspaper in the area is the Pensacola News Journal, with offices on Romana Street in downtown; the News Journal is owned by the Gannett Company. There is an alternative weekly newspaper, Inweekly.

Pensacola is home to WEAR-TV, the ABC affiliate for Pensacola, Navarre, Fort Walton Beach, and Mobile, Alabama, and WSRE-TV, the local PBS member station, which is operated by Pensacola State College. Other television stations in the market include WALA-TV, the Fox affiliate; WKRG, the CBS affiliate; and WPMI, the NBC affiliate, which are all located in Mobile. Cable service in the city is provided by Cox Communications and AT&T U-Verse. WUWF is the area's NPR affiliate and is based at the University of West Florida. WPCS (FM) is broadcast from the Pensacola Christian College campus, where the nationwide Rejoice Radio Network maintains its studio.

Pensacola Magazine, the city's monthly glossy magazine, and Northwest Florida's Business Climate, the only business magazine devoted to the region, are published locally. The News Journal also publishes Home & Garden Weekly magazine as well as the monthly Bella, devoted to women.

Infrastructure

Transportation

Aviation
Major air traffic in the Pensacola and greater northwest Florida area is handled by Pensacola International Airport.  , airlines serving Pensacola International Airport are American Airlines, Delta Air Lines, Frontier Airlines, Silver Airways, Southwest Airlines, Boutique Airlines, Spirit Airlines, and United Airlines.

Railroads
Pensacola was first connected by rail with Montgomery, Alabama, via the Alabama and Florida Railroad, completed in 1861 just before the start of the Civil War. During the war, most of the rails between Pensacola and the Alabama state line were removed to construct other railroad lines urgently needed elsewhere in the Confederacy. The line to Pensacola was not rebuilt until 1868, and was acquired by the Louisville and Nashville Railroad in 1880.  In 1882, the Pensacola and Atlantic Railroad was completed from Pensacola to Chattahoochee, Florida, linking Pensacola with the rest of the state.  This line was also acquired by the L&N.

By 1928, a number of short lines built northward from Pensacola to Kimbrough, Alabama, were acquired by the Frisco Railroad, giving it access to the port of Pensacola.  Some thirty years later, retired Frisco steam engine 1355 was donated to the city and stands in the median of Garden Street, near the site of the now-demolished Frisco passenger station.

Frisco passenger service to Pensacola ended in 1955, and L&N passenger service, including the streamlined Gulf Wind, ended in 1971 with the advent of Amtrak.  However, from early 1993 through August 2005 Pensacola was served by the tri-weekly Amtrak Sunset Limited, but service east of New Orleans to Jacksonville and Orlando was suspended due to damage to the rail line of CSX during Hurricane Katrina in 2005.

In the 21st century, freight service to and from Pensacola is provided by L&N successor CSX as well as Frisco successor Alabama and Gulf Coast Railway, a short line.  On June 1, 2019, the newly formed Florida Gulf & Atlantic Railroad, a Class III railroad headquartered in Tallahassee, acquired the CSX main line from Pensacola to Baldwin, Florida, near Jacksonville, becoming the Panhandle's only east–west freight hauler.  A news report on the new railroad in mid-2019 noted that Amtrak indicated that the Panhandle had a "near-zero chance" of seeing passenger service restored.  Pensacola and Tallahassee are the two largest metropolitan areas in Florida without any passenger rail service.

Major highways
  Interstate 10
  Interstate 110
  U.S. Route 29
  U.S. Route 90 & U.S. Route 90 Alternate
  U.S. Route 98 & U.S. Route 98 Business
  State Road 289 Ninth Avenue
  State Road 291 Davis Highway
  State Road 292 Pace Boulevard
  State Road 295 New Warrington Road, Farfield Drive
  State Road 296 Michigan Avenue, Beverly Parkway, Brent Lane, Bayou Boulevard, Perry Street
  State Road 742 Creighton Road, Burgess Road
  State Road 750 Airport Boulevard

Mass transit

The local bus service is the Escambia County Area Transit. In December 2007, ECAT announced that it would cut many of its routes citing poor rider frequency. However, in January 2008, ECAT announced that it would expand service to neighboring Gulf Breeze and change existing routes to more convenient locations.
Pensacola also has a ferry service owned by the National Park Service. It has stops in Downtown Pensacola, Pensacola Beach and Fort Pickens.

Bus
The city is served by Greyhound Bus and Greyhound Lines.

Hospitals
Hospitals in Pensacola include Ascension Sacred Heart Hospital, Baptist Hospital, Encompass Health Rehabilitation Hospital, HCA Florida West Hospital,  Select Specialty Hospital, and West Florida Hospital.

Notable people

Bands from Pensacola
 Finite Automata, an industrial band
 This Bike is a Pipe Bomb, a folk-punk band
 Twothirtyeight, indie rock band
Body Head Bangerz, hip hop group
McAlyster, Country music group

Sister cities

Pensacola's sister cities are:

 Chimbote, Peru
 Escazú, Costa Rica
 Gero, Japan
 Isla Mujeres, Mexico
 Horlivka, Ukraine
 Miraflores, Peru
 Kaohsiung, Taiwan
 Macharaviaya, Spain

See also

 Blue Angels
 Brownsville Revival
 Escambia Bay Bridge
 Escambia High School riots
 Gulf Breeze, Florida
 Marion C. Bascom
 Murders of Byrd and Melanie Billings (July 9, 2009)
 Navarre, Florida
 USS Pensacola, 4 ships

References

World War II Heritage Cities

External links

 Official website
 Pensapedia, the Pensacola encyclopedia
 Pensacola Bay Area Convention & Visitors Bureau
 www.hurricanecity.com/city/pensacola Hurricane history for Pensacola 

 
1698 establishments in the Spanish Empire
County seats in Florida
Populated places on the Intracoastal Waterway in Florida
Cities in Escambia County, Florida
Former colonial and territorial capitals in the United States
Port cities and towns of the Florida Gulf coast
Populated places established in 1559
Cities in Florida
Cities in Pensacola metropolitan area
British Florida
List of place names of Choctaw origin in the United States